Rolewice  is a village in the administrative district of Gmina Dobiegniew, within Strzelce-Drezdenko County, Lubusz Voivodeship, in western Poland.

The village has a population of 190.

References

Rolewice